Circle of Love may refer to:

Music
 Circle of Love (Steve Miller Band album), 1981, and the title track
 Circle of Love (Sister Sledge album), 1975, and the title track
 "Circle of Love" (song), a song written by Dolly Parton, from the 2016 album by Jennifer Nettles To Celebrate Christmas

Film
 Circle of Love (film), a 1964 French film

See also
 Dolly Parton's Christmas of Many Colors: Circle of Love, a 2016 TV film
 La Ronde (disambiguation)